Vaashi is a 1983 Indian Malayalam film, directed by M. R. Joseph and produced by Manjeri Chandran and Padiyath Ahammed Kutty. The film stars Nedumudi Venu, Sukumaran, Jalaja and Unnimary in the lead roles. The film has musical score by Raveendran.

Cast

 Baiju as Adv. Satheesh Mulloor
 Anu Mohan as Goutham Ganesh
 Rony David as Jose
 Kottayam Ramesh as Judge
 Sukumaran
 G. Suresh Kumar as Mathew, Abin's father 
 Anagha Aarayanan as Anusha Sivakumar
 Sreelakshmi as Madhavi's Mother 
 Nandhu as Shivakumar
 Maya Menon
 Maya Vishwanath

Soundtrack
The music was composed by Raveendran and the lyrics were written by Mankombu Gopalakrishnan.

References

External links
 

1983 films
1980s Malayalam-language films